Killingholme may refer to:

North Killingholme, village and civil parish in Lincolnshire, England
Historical references (pre 20th century), to "Killingholme" generally imply North Killingholme the larger of the two villages
North Killingholme Haven, a harbour in Lincolnshire
South Killingholme, village and civil parish in Lincolnshire, England
RNAS Killingholme, a First World War seaplane base
RAF North Killingholme, an airfield, used extensively during the Second World War
Killingholme railway station, Lincolnshire, England